Çamtepe can refer to:

 Çamtepe, Burhaniye
 Çamtepe, Tarsus